The Union Depot in Ashland, Wisconsin, United States, was listed on the National Register of Historic Places in 1979.  It has also been known as the Ashland Depot.

It is a red brick building with stone belt courses, quoins, and other details.

The depot was designed by Charles Sumner Frost and was used by the Chicago and North Western Railway and its subsidiary, the Chicago, St. Paul, Minneapolis and Omaha Railway (Omaha Road), for the Flambeau 400 service to Chicago. More recently, the building has been utilized as a fitness center and the train tracks converted into an exercise trail.

References

Railway stations on the National Register of Historic Places in Wisconsin
National Register of Historic Places in Ashland County, Wisconsin
Ashland
Charles Sumner Frost buildings
Queen Anne architecture in Wisconsin
Railway stations in the United States opened in 1900
Former railway stations in Wisconsin
Former Omaha Road stations